The Clarkia Formation is a geologic formation in Idaho. It preserves fossils dating back to the Neogene period.

See also 
 List of fossiliferous stratigraphic units in Idaho
 Paleontology in Idaho
 Clarkia fossil beds

References
 

Geologic formations of Idaho
Miocene Series of North America
Neogene Idaho
Lagerstätten
Fossiliferous stratigraphic units of North America
Paleontology in Idaho